The 2013 season is the 118th year in the club's history, the 102nd season in Clube de Regatas do Flamengo's football existence, and their 43rd in the Brazilian Série A, having never been relegated from the top division.

Club

First-team staff
As of July 9, 2014.

Other information

First-team squad
As of 9 July 2014, according to combined sources on the official website.

Players with Dual Nationality
   Marcos González
   Marcelo Moreno

Out on loan

Transfers

In

Out

Statistics

Appearances and goals
Last updated on July 9, 2014.
 Players in italic have left the club during the season.

|}

Top scorers
Includes all competitive matches

Clean sheets
Includes all competitive matches

Disciplinary record

Overview

Competitions

Campeonato Carioca

Taça Guanabara

Matches

Knockout stage

Taça Rio

Matches

Copa do Brasil

First round

Second round

Third round

Round of 16

Quarterfinals

Semifinals

Final

Série A

League table

Matches

Honors

Individuals

References

External links
 Clube de Regatas do Flamengo
 Flamengo official website (in Portuguese)

Brazilian football clubs 2013 season
CR Flamengo seasons